Archduke Karl Ludwig Josef Maria of Austria (30 July 1833 – 19 May 1896) was the younger brother of both Franz Joseph I of Austria and Maximilian I of Mexico, and the father of Archduke Franz Ferdinand of Austria (1863–1914), whose assassination ignited World War I. His grandson was the last emperor of Austria, Charles I.

Biography

He was born at Schönbrunn Palace in Vienna, the son of Archduke Franz Karl of Austria (1802–1878) and his wife Princess Sophie of Bavaria (1805–1872).

His mother ensured he was raised a devout Roman Catholic by the Vienna Prince-archbishop Joseph Othmar Rauscher, a conviction that evolved into religious mania in his later years.

Though not interested in politics, the 20-year-old joined the Galician government of Count Agenor Romuald Gołuchowski and in 1855 accepted his appointment as Tyrolean stadtholder in Innsbruck, where he took his residence at Ambras Castle. However, he found his authority to exert power restricted by the Austrian cabinet of his cousin Archduke Rainer Ferdinand and Baron Alexander von Bach. He finally laid down the office upon the issue of the 1861 February Patent for a life as patron of the arts and sciences.

As the eldest surviving brother of the Emperor, Karl Ludwig, after the death of his nephew Crown Prince Rudolf of Austria in 1889, became heir presumptive to the Austro-Hungarian Empire. A newspaper article appeared shortly after the death of his nephew claiming that the Archduke had renounced his succession rights in favor of his eldest son Franz Ferdinand. This rumor proved to be false.

Marriage and family

Karl Ludwig married three times.

His first wife, whom he married on 4 November 1856 at Dresden, was his first cousin Margaretha of Saxony (1840–1858), the daughter of Johann of Saxony (1801–1873) and Amalie Auguste of Bavaria (1801–1877). She died on 15 September 1858 and they had no children.

His second wife, whom he married by proxy on 16 October 1862 at Rome, and in person on 21 October 1862 at Venice, was Princess Maria Annunciata of Bourbon-Two Sicilies (1843–1871), daughter of Ferdinand II of the Two Sicilies (1810–1859) and Maria Theresa of Austria (1816–1867).

They had four children:
 Archduke Franz Ferdinand of Austria (December 18, 1863 – June 28, 1914), whose assassination was a cause for the First World War. He married morganatically Countess Sophie Chotek von Chotkow und Wognin on 1 July 1900. They had three children.
 Archduke Otto Franz of Austria (21 April 1865 – 1 November 1906) he married Princess Maria Josepha of Saxony (1867–1944) on 2 October 1886. They had two sons, including Karl I, the last Emperor of Austria.
 Archduke Ferdinand Karl of Austria (27 December 1868 – 12 March 1915) he married morganatically Bertha Czuber on 15 August 1909. 
 Archduchess Margarete Sophie of Austria (13 May 1870 – 24 August 1902) she married Albrecht, Duke of Württemberg on 24 January 1893. They had seven children.

Maria Annunciata died on 4 May 1871.

His third wife, whom he married on 23 July 1873 at Kleinheubach, was Infanta Maria Theresa of Portugal (1855–1944), daughter of Miguel I of Portugal (1802–1866) and Adelaide of Löwenstein-Wertheim-Rosenberg (1831–1909).

They had two daughters:
 Archduchess Maria Annunziata of Austria (31 July 1876 – 8 April 1961). Abbess of the Theresia Convent in the Hradschin, Prague.
 Archduchess Elisabeth Amalie of Austria (7 July 1878 – 13 March 1960) she married Prince Aloys of Liechtenstein on 20 April 1903. They had eight children.

Death
Karl Ludwig died of typhoid at Schönbrunn in Vienna after returning from a journey to Palestine and Egypt, allegedly after the consumption of contaminated Jordan waters. 

His widow Maria Teresa died on 12 February 1944.

Honours and awards 
Austrian orders and decorations
 Knight of the Golden Fleece, 1852
 Grand Cross of St. Stephen, 1859
 Military Merit Medal on red ribbon
 Long Service Cross for Officers, 2nd Class

Foreign orders and decorations

Ancestry

See also
 List of heirs to the Austrian throne

References

External links
 

1833 births
1896 deaths
Deaths from typhoid fever
Infectious disease deaths in Austria
Nobility from Vienna
Austrian princes
Burials at the Imperial Crypt
House of Habsburg-Lorraine
Knights of the Golden Fleece of Austria
Grand Crosses of the Order of Saint Stephen of Hungary
Knights Grand Cross of the Order of Pope Pius IX
Recipients of the Order of the White Eagle (Russia)
Recipients of the Order of St. Anna, 1st class
Recipients of the Order of the Cross of Takovo
Non-inheriting heirs presumptive